The R549 road is a regional road on the Dingle Peninsula in County Kerry, Ireland. It travels from the R559 road at Murreagh, north to Ballydavid Head before turning south to rejoin the R559 at Dingle.

References

Regional roads in the Republic of Ireland
Roads in County Kerry